The University of Pennsylvania Carey Law School (also known as Penn Law or Penn Carey Law) is the law school of the Ivy League University of Pennsylvania, a private research university in Philadelphia, Pennsylvania.  It is among the most selective and oldest law schools in the United States, and it is currently ranked sixth overall by U.S. News & World Report. It offers the degrees of Juris Doctor (J.D.), Master of Laws (LL.M.), Master of Comparative Laws (LL.C.M.), Master in Law (M.L.), and Doctor of the Science of Law (S.J.D.).

The entering class typically consists of approximately 250 students, and admission is highly competitive. Penn Law's 2020 weighted first-time bar passage rate was 98.5 percent. The school has consistently ranked among top 14 ("T14") law schools identified by U.S. News & World Report, since it began publishing its rankings. For the class of 2024, 49 percent of students were women, 40 percent identified as persons of color, and 12 percent of students enrolled with an advanced degree.

The school offers an extensive curriculum and hosts various student groups, research centers, and activities. Students publish the University of Pennsylvania Law Review, the oldest law journal in the United States. Students also publish The Regulatory Review, a regulatory news, analysis, and commentary that publishes daily. Penn Law students have the option to earn certificates of specialization in fields such as East Asian Studies or Gender and Sexuality Studies. Prior to graduation, each student must complete at least 70 hours of pro bono service.

Among the school's alumni are a US Supreme Court Justice, at least 76 judges of United States court system, nine state Supreme Court Justices, and three supreme court justices of foreign countries, at least 46 members of United States Congress as well as nine olympians, five of whom won thirteen medals, several founders of law firms, university presidents and deans, business entrepreneurs, leaders in the public sector, and government officials.

Based on student survey responses, ABA and NALP data; 99.6 percent of the Class of 2020 obtained full-time employment after graduation. The median salary for the Class of 2019 was $190,000, as 75.2 percent of students joined law firms and 11.6 percent obtained judicial clerkships. The law school was ranked #2 of all law schools nationwide by the National Law Journal, for sending the highest percentage of 2019 graduates to join the 100 largest law firms in the U.S., constituting 58.4 percent.

History
The University of Pennsylvania Law School traces its origins to a series of Lectures on Law delivered in 1790 through 1792 by James Wilson, one of only  six signers of the United States Declaration of Independence and the United States Constitution. Wilson is credited with being one of the two primary authors (the other being James Madison) of the first draft of such constitution due to his membership on the Committee of Detail established by the United States Constitutional Convention on July 24, 1787 to draft a text reflecting the agreements made by the Convention up to that point. 

Wilson gave these "lectures on law" to President George Washington and Vice President John Adams and rest of the cabinet including Secretary of State Thomas Jefferson as a Penn Professor and during Wilson's time as one of the original five Associate Justices nominated by George Washington (and approved by United States Senate via unanimous voice vote on September 26, 1789, with Wilson's term commencing October 5, 1789 and the terms of the other four at various dates in 1790) to the initial panel of United States Supreme Court. In 1792, Associate Justice of United States Supreme Court of the United States, James Wilson, was appointed as Penn's first "full professor of law".

In 1817, Penn Trustees appointed Charles Wilson Hare as the second professor of law. Hare apparently only taught for one year as he then became "afflicted with loss of reason".

Penn began offering a full-time program in law in 1850, under the leadership of the third professor of law at the Law Department of the University of Pennsylvania, George Sharswood. Sharswood was also named Dean of Penn's Law School in 1852 and served through 1867, and was later appointed as Chief Justice of the Supreme Court of Pennsylvania (1879 - 1882). 

In 1852, Penn was the first law school in the nation to publish a law journal. Then called The American Law Register, the University of Pennsylvania Law Review is the nation's oldest law review and one of the most-cited law journals in the world.

In 1881, Carrie Burnham Kilgore became the first woman admitted to Penn Law, and in 1888, Aaron Albert Mossell became the first African-American man to graduate from the school.  Sadie Tanner Mossell Alexander, Mossell's daughter, was awarded the Frances Sergeant Pepper fellowship in 1921 and subsequently became the first African-American to receive a PhD in economics in the United States, a degree she earned at the University of Pennsylvania. In 1927, Alexander became the first African-American woman to graduate from Penn Law and in 1929, she became the first African-American woman to be admitted to practice law in the Commonwealth of Pennsylvania.

William Draper Lewis was named dean of Penn Law in 1896.

In 1900, the Trustees of the University of Pennsylvania approved his and others' request to move the law school to the core of campus and to its current location at the intersection of 34th and Chestnut Streets. Under Lewis' deanship, the law school was one of the first schools to emphasize legal teaching by full-time professors instead of practitioners, a system that is still followed today. 

As legal education became more formalized, the school initiated a three-year curriculum and instituted stringent admissions requirements.

After 30 years with the law school, Lewis founded the American Law Institute (ALI) in 1925, which was seated in the Law School and was chaired by Lewis himself. The ALI was later chaired by another Penn Law Dean, Herbert Funk Goodrich and Penn Law Professors George Wharton Pepper and Geoffrey C. Hazard Jr.

Except for the period of time during which Penn Law's policy prohibited military recruiters from recruiting on the law school campus, when the military openly refused to hire gays, bisexuals and lesbians, Penn Law has actively supported the armed forces. The Harold Cramer Memorial Scholarship Program was established in June 2021 to ensure that all veterans admitted to Penn Law will be able to afford to attend Penn Law.

  
In 1969, Martha Field became the first woman to join the Penn Law faculty; she is now a professor at Harvard Law School. Other notable women who have been or are presently professors at Penn Law include Lani Guinier, Elizabeth Warren, and Anita L. Allen.

From 1974 to 1978 the Dean of the law school was Louis Pollak, who later became a federal judge.

Since Judge Pollak ascended to the bench, Penn Law has attracted a noteworthy number of deans including James O. Freedman, the former president of Dartmouth College, Colin Diver, the former president of Reed College, and Michael Fitts, the current president of Tulane University.

In November 2019, Penn Law received a $125 million donation from the W.P. Carey Foundation, the largest single donation to any law school to date; the school was renamed University of Pennsylvania Carey Law School, in honor of the foundation's first president, Penn Law alumnus Francis J. Carey (1926–2014), who was the brother of William Polk Carey (1930 - 2012), founder of the W. P. Carey Inc. REIT, and of the charitable foundation. The change was met by some controversy, and a petition to quash the abbreviated "Carey Law", in favor of the traditional "Penn Law", was circulated and it was agreed that the official short form name for the next few years could remain "Penn Law" and/or "Penn Carey Law".

Osagie O. Imasogie, a 1985 graduate of Penn Law, is the current Chair of the University of Pennsylvania Carey Law School Board of Overseers, having replaced Perry Golkin on January 1, 2021.
Imasogie has been a member of Penn Law School Board of Overseers since 2006 and more recently a Trustee on the Board of Trustees of the University of Pennsylvania. Imasogie, a graduate of two law schools in Nigeria and London School of Economics and Political Science, has held senior positions with a diverse group of professional services and bio-tech companies such as GSK, DuPont, Merck, Price Waterhouse, Schnader Harrison Segal & Lewis and is presently an adjunct professor at Penn Law, where he teaches a seminar on “Intellectual Property and National Economic Value Creation”. He is the first African-born chair of an American law school.

Campus

The University of Pennsylvania campus covers over 269 acres (~1 km²) in a contiguous area of West Philadelphia's University City district. All of Penn's schools, including the law school, and most of its research institutes are located on this campus. Much of Penn's architecture was designed by the architecture firm of Cope & Stewardson, whose principal architects combined the Gothic architecture of the University of Oxford and the University of Cambridge with the local landscape to establish the Collegiate Gothic style.

The Law School consists of four interconnecting buildings around a central courtyard.  At the east end of the courtyard is Silverman Hall, built in 1900, housing the Levy Conference Center, classrooms, faculty offices, the Gittis Center for Clinical Legal Studies, and administrative and student offices. Directly opposite is Tanenbaum Hall, home to the Biddle Law Library several law journals, administrative offices, and student spaces. The law library houses 1,053,824 volumes and volume equivalents making it the 4th-largest law library in the country. Gittis Hall sits on the north side and has new classrooms (renovated in 2006) and new and expanded faculty offices.  Opposite is Golkin Hall, which contains  and includes a state-of-the-art court room, 350-seat auditorium, seminar rooms, faculty and administrative offices, a two-story entry hall, and a roof-top garden.

A small row of restaurants and shops faces the law school on Sansom Street.  Nearby are the Penn Bookstore, the Pottruck Center (a  multi-purpose sports activity area), the Institute of Contemporary Art, a performing arts center, and area shops.

Academics

Admissions
For the J.D. class entering in the fall of 2023, 14.6 percent out of 6,146 applicants were offered admission, with 249 matriculating. The class boasted 25th and 75th LSAT percentiles of 164 and 171, respectively, with a median of 170. The 25th and 75th undergraduate GPA percentiles were 3.57 and 3.95, respectively, with a median of 3.89. 13 percent of matriculating students identified as first-generation college students, and 29 percent identified as first-generation professional school students.

Over 1,250 students from 70 countries applied to Penn's LLM program for the fall of 2019. The incoming class consisted of 126 students from more than 30 countries.

The entering class typically consists of approximately 250 students, and admission is highly competitive. Penn Law's July 2018 weighted first-time bar passage rate was 92.09%. The law school is one of the "T14" law schools, that is, schools that have consistently ranked within the top 14 law schools since U.S. News & World Report began publishing rankings. In the class entering in 2018, over half of students were women, over a third identified as persons of color, and 10% of students enrolled with an advanced degree.

Multidisciplinary Focus
Throughout its modern history, Penn has been known for its strong focus on inter-disciplinary studies, a character that was shaped early on by Dean William Draper Lewis. Its medium-size student body and the tight integration with the rest of Penn's schools (the "One University Policy") have been instrumental in achieving that aim. More than 50 percent of the Law School's courses are interdisciplinary, and it offers more than 20 joint and dual degree programs, including a JD/MBA (Wharton School of the University of Pennsylvania), a JD/PhD in Communication (Annenberg School for Communication at the University of Pennsylvania), and a JD/MD (Perelman School of Medicine).

Various certificate programs that can be completed within the three-year JD program, e.g. in Business and Public Policy, in conjunction with the Wharton School), in Cross-Sector Innovation with the School of Social Policy & Practice, in International Business and Law with the Themis Joint Certificate with ESADE Law School in Barcelona, Spain, and in Social Cognitive and Affective Neuroscience (SCAN). 19 percent of the Class of 2007 earned a certificate. 57 percent of the Class of 2020 and 52 percent of the Class of 2021 pursued a Certifiate.

Penn Law also offers joint degrees with international affiliates, such as Sciences Po (France), ESADE (Spain), and the University of Hong Kong Faculty of Law. The School has further expanded its international programs with the addition of the International Internship Program, the International Summer Human Rights Program, and the Global Research Seminar, all under the umbrella of the Penn Law Global Initiative. Penn Law takes part in a number of international annual events, such as the Monroe E. Price Media Law Moot Court Competition at the University of Oxford and the Waseda Transnational Program at the Waseda Law School in Tokyo.

Clinics and externships
For more than 40 years, students in Penn Law’s Gittis Center for Clinical Legal Studies have had the opportunity to learn valuable practical legal skills and put theory into practice while helping many clients in the community. The Law School offers in-house clinics, including: civil practice, criminal defense, the Detkin intellectual property and technology legal clinic, entrepreneurship, interdisciplinary child advocacy, legislative, mediation, and transnational. Students can also receive credit for completing externships with non-profit and government institutes such as the ACLU of Pennsylvania or the City of Philadelphia Law Department.

Toll Public Interest Center and related activities
Penn was the first national law school to establish a mandatory pro bono program, and the first law school to win the American Bar Association's Pro Bono Publico Award.  The public interest center was founded in 1989 and was renamed the Toll Public Interest Center in 2006 in acknowledgement of a $10 million gift from Robert Toll (Executive Chairman of the Board of Toll Brothers) and Jane Toll. In 2011, the Tolls donated an additional $2.5 million. In October 2020, The Robert and Jane Toll Foundation announced that it was donating fifty million dollars ($50,000,000) to Penn Law, which is the largest gift in history to be devoted entirely to the training and support of public interest lawyers, and among the ten (10) largest gifts ever to a law school in the United States of America. The gift expands the Toll Public Interest Scholars and Fellows Program by doubling the number of public interest graduates in the coming decade through a combination of full and partial tuition scholarships. The Toll Public Interest Center has supported many students who have pursued public interest fellowships and work following graduation.

Students complete 70 hours of pro bono service as a condition of graduation. More than half of the Class of 2021 substantially exceeded the requirement. Students can create their own placements, or work through over 30 student-led organizations that focus their pro bono service in a variety of substantive areas.

The Law School awards Toll Public Interest Scholarships to accomplished public interest matriculants, and has a generous Public Interest Loan Repayment Program for graduates pursuing careers in public interest. Students interested in public interest work receive funding for summer positions through money from the student-run Equal Justice Foundation or via funding from Penn Law. Additionally, the Law School funds students interested in working internationally through the International Human Rights Fellowship.

Centers and Institutes
Penn Law hosts eleven different academic centers, institutes, programs, and research groups wherein students and faculty work together on interdisciplinary scholarship. Notable among them are the Penn Program on Regulation, directed by professor of law and political science Cary Coglianese; the Quattrone Center for the Fair Administration of Justice, directed by Faculty Director Paul Heaton. Other Centers and Institutes include: Center for Asian Law;  Center for Technology, Innovation, and Competition; Institute for Law and Economics; Institute for Law and Philosophy; Criminal Law Research Group; Legal History Consortium; Center for Tax Law and Policy; and Penn Program on Documentaries and the Law.

Biddle Law Library
Penn’s Law library holds over one million volumes, mostly consisting of American primary and secondary materials. Approximately one-third of the Library’s collection is composed of foreign, international, and comparative legal texts. The Library also holds subscriptions for digital resources such as LexisNexis, Westlaw, and Bloomberg Law, which provide students and faculty with access to wide breadth of journal articles, treatises, and case texts.

Biddle is also home to archives from both the American Law Institute and the American College of Bankruptcy. Biddle also holds Penn Law’s own archival collection, which consists of manuscripts, rare books, oral histories, and certain Penn Law school records.

Journals
Students at the law school publish several legal journals. The flagship publication is the University of Pennsylvania Law Review, the oldest law review in the United States. The University of Pennsylvania Law Review started in 1852 as the American Law Register, and was renamed to its current title in 1908. It is one of the most frequently cited law journals in the world, and one of the four journals that are responsible for The Bluebook, along with the Harvard, Yale, and Columbia law journals. Penn Law Review articles have captured seminal historical moments in the 19th and 20th centuries, such as the passage of the 19th Amendment; the lawlessness of the first and second World Wars; the rise of the civil rights movement; and the war in Vietnam.

Other law journals include:
University of Pennsylvania Journal of Constitutional Law, one of the top 50 law journals in the United States based on citations and impact.
University of Pennsylvania Journal of International Law, formerly known as Journal of International Economic Law, formerly known as Journal of International Business Law, formerly known as Journal of Comparative Business and Capital Market Law
University of Pennsylvania Journal of Business Law, formerly known as Journal of Business and Employment Law
University of Pennsylvania Journal of Law and Social Change
Asian Law Review, formerly known as East Asian Law Review, formerly known as Chinese Law and Policy Review
Journal of Law & Public Affairs

U.S. Supreme Court clerkships
Since 2000, Penn has had seven alumni serve as judicial clerks at the United States Supreme Court. This record gives Penn a ranking of 10th among all law schools for supplying such law clerks for the period 2000-2019. Penn has placed 48 clerks at the U.S. Supreme Court in its history, ranked 11th among law schools; this group includes Curtis R. Reitz, who is the Algernon Sydney Biddle Professor of Law, Emeritus at Penn.

Employment
According to ABA and NALP data, 99.6 percent of the Class of 2020 obtained full-time employment after graduation. The median salary for the Class of 2019 was $190,000, as 75.2 percent of students joined law firms and 11.6 percent obtained a judicial clerkship. Penn combines a strong tradition in public service with being one of the top feeders of law students to the most prestigious law firms. Penn Law was the first top-ranked law school to establish a mandatory pro bono requirement, and the first law school to win American Bar Association's Pro Bono Publico Award. Many students pursue public interest careers with the support of fellowship grants such as the Skadden Fellowship, called by The Los Angeles Times "a legal Peace Corps."

About 75 percent of each graduating class enters private practice, bringing with them the ethos of pro bono service. In 2020, the Law School placed more than 70 percent of its graduates into the United States' top law firms, maintaining Penn's rank as the number one law school in the nation for the percentage of students securing employment at these top law firms. The Law School was ranked #4 of all law schools nationwide by Law.com in terms of sending the highest percentage of 2021 graduates to the largest 100 law firms in the U.S. (55 percent).

Based on student survey responses, ABA, and NALP data, 99.2% of the Class of 2018 obtained full-time employment after graduation, with a median salary of $180,000, as 76% of students joined law firms and 11% obtained judicial clerkships.  The law school was ranked # 2 of all law schools nationwide by the National Law Journal in terms of sending the highest percentage of 2018 graduates to the 100 largest law firms in the US (60%).

Costs
The total cost of attendance (including tuition of $63,610, fees, and living expenses), for J.D. students for the 2020-2021 academic year was $94,052.

Notable alumni

Judiciary
 Owen Roberts, U.S. Supreme Court Justice 
 James Harry Covington, Chief Justice of the Supreme Court of the District of Columbia 
 Daniel John Layton, Chief Justice of the Delaware Supreme Court 
 Robert Nelson Cornelius Nix, Jr., Chief Justice of the Pennsylvania Supreme Court
 Horace Stern, Chief Justice of the Pennsylvania Supreme Court
 George Sharswood, Chief Justice of the Pennsylvania Supreme Court
 Deborah Tobias Poritz, Chief Justice of the New Jersey Supreme Court
 Ayala Procaccia, Justice of the Supreme Court of Israel 
 Ronald Wilson, Justice of the High Court of Australia
 Yvonne Mokgoro, Justice of the Constitutional Court of South Africa
 Abdul Kallon, District Judge on the U.S. District Court for the Northern District of Alabama
 Rudolph Contreras, District Judge on the U.S. District Court for the District of Columbia
 Arlin Adams, Circuit Judge on the U.S. Court of Appeals for the Third Circuit
 Max Rosenn, Circuit Judge on the U.S. Court of Appeals for the Third Circuit
 Dolores Sloviter, Circuit Judge on the U.S. Court of Appeals for the Third Circuit
 James Hunter III, Circuit Judge on the U.S. Court of Appeals for the Third Circuit
 Patty Shwartz, Circuit Judge of the U.S. Court of Appeals for the Third Circuit
 Phyllis Kravitch, Senior Circuit Judge on the U.S. Court of Appeals for the Eleventh Circuit
 Helene N. White, Circuit judge on the U.S. Court of Appeals for the Sixth Circuit
 Gerard Hogan, Justice of the Court of Appeal of Ireland
 Jasper Yeates Brinton, the architect of the Egyptian court system, Justice of the Egyptian Supreme Court, and former U.S. Legal Advisor to Egypt
 Mike Fain, Judge on the Ohio Court of Appeals
 Richard L. Gabriel, Justice of the Colorado Supreme Court 
 Gordon Goodman, Judge on the Texas 1st District Court of Appeals
 James S. Halpern, Judge on the U.S. Tax Court
 Raymond Headen, Judge on the 8th District Court of Appeals of Ohio
 Randy J. Holland, Justice on the Delaware Supreme Court 
 Lucinda E. Jesson, Judge on the Minnesota Court of Appeals 
 Peter Brunswick Krauser, Judge on the Court of Special Appeals of Maryland
 Leo Strine, Chief Justice on the Delaware Supreme Court
Karen L. Valihura (Penn Law Class of 1986)  Justice of the Delaware Supreme Court (appointed June 6, 2014)
 Lori W. Will, Vice Chancellor of the Delaware Court of Chancery

Government
 Philip Werner Amram, Asst. Attorney General of the United States, 1939–42
 Harry W. Bass, first African American member of the Pennsylvania House of Representatives, 1911–1914
 Louis A. Bloom, Pennsylvania State Representative (1947–1952)
 William H. Brown, III, chairman, EEOC
 Gilbert F. Casellas, chairman, EEOC and General Counsel of the Air Force
 Joseph Sill Clark, U.S. Senator from Pennsylvania and Mayor of Philadelphia
Walter J. "Jay" Clayton III, chairman, U.S. Securities and Exchange Commission, 2017–present.
 Josiah E. DuBois Jr., U.S. State Department official, instrumental in Holocaust rescue
 Thomas K. Finletter, U.S Secretary of the Air Force, 1950–1953; Ambassador to NATO, 1961–65
 Shirley Franklin, Mayor of Atlanta, 2002–10 
 Lindley Miller Garrison, U.S. Secretary of War, 1913–16
 Oscar Goodman, Mayor of Las Vegas, Nevada
 William B. Gray, United States Attorney for Vermont, 1977-1981
 E. Grey Lewis, general counsel of the U.S. Navy
 Jena Griswold, Colorado Secretary of State 
Henry G. Hager, Pennsylvania State Senator (1973–1984), President pro tempore of the Pennsylvania Senate (1981–1984)
 Earl G. Harrison, Commissioner of the U.S. Immigration and Naturalization Service, 1942–44  
Charles A. Heimbold, Jr., Penn Law Class of 1960, U.S. Ambassador to Sweden and former chairman and CEO of Bristol-Myers Squibb Company
 Henry Martyn Hoyt, Jr., Solicitor General of the United States
 Robert F. Kent, Pennsylvania State Representative (1947–1956) and Pennsylvania State Treasurer (1957–1961)
 Conor Lamb, US Representative for Pennsylvania’s 17th Congressional District 
 Andrew Lelling, U.S. Attorney for Massachusetts.
Albert Dutton MacDade, Pennsylvania State Senator and Judge in the Pennsylvania Court of Common Pleas
 Harry Arista Mackey, Mayor of Philadelphia
 Marjorie Margolies-Mezvinsky, member of the U.S. House of Representatives and women's rights activist
 William M. Meredith, U.S. Secretary of the Treasury, 1849–50
 Charles Robert Miller, Governor of Delaware
 Raul Roco, former presidential candidate and Secretary of Education in the Philippines
 Mary Gay Scanlon, US Representative for Pennsylvania’s 5th Congressional District 
 Martin J. Silverstein, U.S. Ambassador to Uruguay 
Heath Tarbert, Nominee for Assistant Secretary of the Treasury for International Markets and Development in the U.S. (2017)
 Robert J. Walker, U.S. Secretary of the Treasury, 1840–45
 Charles A. Waters, Pennsylvania State Treasurer, Pennsylvania Auditor General, and judge in the Pennsylvania Courts of Common Pleas
 George W. Wickersham, Attorney General of the United States, 1909–1913; instrumental in the breakup of Standard Oil; President of the Council on Foreign Relations (1933–36)
 George Washington Woodruff, Acting U.S. Secretary of the Interior under President Theodore Roosevelt
 Faith Whittlesey, United States Ambassador to Switzerland
 Chiang Wan-an, Mayor of Taipei

Academia
 Regina Austin, William A. Schnader Professor of Law at Penn Law 
 Robert Butkin, Dean of the University of Tulsa College of Law 
 Kimberly Kessler Ferzan, Earle Hepburn Professor of Law; co-director, Institute of Law & Philosophy, Penn Law 
 Douglas Frenkel, Morris Shuster Practice Professor of Law, director of Mediation Clinic, Penn Law 
 Jennifer Herbst, professor of law and medical sciences at Quinnipiac University School of Law 
 Kit Kinports, professor of law, Polisher Family Distinguished Faculty Scholar at Penn State Law 
 Nancy J. Knauer, professor of law, director of the law and public policy program at Temple University Beasley School of Law 
 Gerald Korngold, professor of law, program chair, Center for Real Estate Studies at New York Law School 
 Roberta Rosenthal Kwall, Raymond P. Niro Professor of Intellectual Property Law, founding director of the Center for Intellectual Property Law & Information Technology at DePaul University College of Law  
 Timothy F. Malloy, director of UCLA Sustainable Technology and Policy Program at the University of California at Los Angeles School of Law 
 Carrie Menkel-Meadow, Chancellor’s Professor of Law at UC Irvine School of Law 
 Beverly I. Moran, professor of law, Vanderbilt Law School 
 Brian K. Price, clinical professor of law and director of transactional law clinics at Harvard University Law School 
 Jennifer Rosato Perea, Class of 1987, dean, DePaul University College of LawDePaul University College of Law 
 Nadia Sawicki, professor of law, academic director of the Beazley Institute for Health Law & Policy at Loyola University Chicago School of Law
 Sidney A. Shapiro, Frank U. Fletcher Chair of Administrative Law at Wake Forest School of Law 
 Omari Scott Simmons, Howard L. Oleck Professor of Business Law, director of Business law Program at Wake Forest School of Law 
 Amy Sinden, James E. Beasley Professor of Law at Temple University Beasley School of Law
Cynthia Soohoo, director of Human Rights and Gender Justice Clinic at CUNY School of Law 
 Karen Tani, Seaman Family University Professor, Penn Law  
 Tess Wilkinson-Ryan, professor of law and psychology at Penn Law  
 Kamille N. Wolff Dean, director of diversity and inclusion at St. John’s University School of Law 
 Michael J. Yelnosky, Dean and professor of law at Roger Williams University School of Law 
 John Frederick Zeller III, president of Bucknell University 
 Mark Yudof, president of the University of California system
 Peter J. Liacouras, chancellor of Temple University
 John Frederick Zeller III, president of Bucknell University
 Rodney K. Smith, president of Southern Virginia University
 Janice R. Bellace, first president of Singapore Management University
 Fred Hilmer, vice-Ccancellor of the University of New South Wales 
 Robert Butkin, dean of the University of Tulsa College of Law
 William Schnader, drafter of the Uniform Commercial Code 
 William Draper Lewis, founder of the American Law Institute and Dean of Penn Law
 Anthony Amsterdam, professor at New York University School of Law
 Khaled Abou El Fadl, professor of law at UCLA School of Law
 Curtis Reitz, the Algernon Sydney Biddle Professor of Law at the University of Pennsylvania Law School 
 Caroline Burnham Kilgore, Penn Law's first female graduate (1883) 
 Sadie Tanner Mossell Alexander, the first African-American woman to receive a PhD in the U.S. and graduated from Penn Law in 1927
 Anna Mastroianni, professor of law at University of Washington, School of Law

Private practice
 James Harry Covington, co-founder of international law firm Covington & Burling
 Isabel Darlington, second woman to graduate from Penn Law and first to practice law in Chester County, Pennsylvania
 George Wharton Pepper, U.S. Senator from Pennsylvania, and founder of national law firm Pepper Hamilton
 Russell Duane, co-founder of international law firm Duane Morris 
 Stephen Cozen, co-founder of international law firm Cozen O'Connor
 Kalpana Kotagal, partner at Cohen Milstein 
 William Schnader, drafter of the Uniform Commercial Code, co-founder of national law firm Schnader Harrison Segal & Lewis

Business
 Safra Catz, CEO of Oracle Corporation
 David L. Cohen, executive vice-president of Comcast; former chief of staff to Philadelphia mayor, Ed Rendell
 Peter Detkin, co-founder of Intellectual Ventures; former vice-president and assistant general counsel at Intel
 Paul Haaga, chairman of Capital Research and Management Company
 Sam Hamadeh, founder of Vault.com
 Scott Mead, partner and managing director of Goldman Sachs
 Edward Benjamin Shils, professor and founder of the first research center for entrepreneurial studies in the world, at the Wharton School
 Henry Silverman, CEO of Cendant Corporation 
 Gigi Sohn, founder and president of Public Knowledge

Media, Sports, and the Arts

 Irving Baxter (1876 - 1957) Penn Law Class of 1901 competed in the 1900 Olympic Games in Paris, France where he won three silver and two gold medals, winning both the high jump and pole vault competitions and placing second in the standing high jump, the standing triple jump, and the standing long jump; retired from competitive track and field without ever having lost a high jumping contest; admitted to the State Bar of New York, worked at the firm of Nash and Jones on Wall Street, appointed special  judge for City of Utica, NY and U.S. Commissioner of the Northern District of New York
 John Cromwell Bell, Jr. (Penn College Class of 1914 and Penn Law Class of 1917) a founding partner of law firm Bell, Murdoch, Paxson and Dilworth (now known as Dilworth Paxson LLP), appointed as Pennsylvania Secretary of Banking from  1939 to 1942, elected 18th Lieutenant Governor of Pennsylvania and Speaker of the Pennsylvania House of Representatives, and for nineteen (19) days in 1947 automatically succeeded (due to resignation of incumbent Governor) to become 33rd Governor of Pennsylvania., appointed Justice of the Supreme Court of Pennsylvania in 1951, served as Chief Justice from August 1961 until his retirement in January 1972
 John Cromwell (Penn Law Class of 1884) served as District Attorney of Philadelphia (1903–1907), 45th Attorney General of Pennsylvania (January 17, 1911 – January 19, 1915), director of Penn's athletic program, chaired Penn Football committee, was a Penn trustee (1911–), helped found the NCAA, and served on Intercollegiate Football Rules Committee responsible for many of the rule changes made in collegiate football in its early years.
 Renee Chenault-Fattah, co-anchor of weekday edition of WCAU NBC 10 News in Philadelphia
 Anita DeFrantz, 1976 Olympic bronze medalist in the women's eight-oared shell; first woman and first African-American to represent the United States on the International Olympic Committee (IOC); first female vice president of the IOC; two-time vice president of the International Rowing Federation 
 Mark Haines, host on CNBC television network
 El McMeen, guitarist 
 Norman Pearlstine, editor-in-chief of Time 
 Lisa Scottoline, author of legal thrillers
 Moe Jaffe, (Wharton Undergraduate Class of 1923 and Penn Law Class of 1926) bandleader and songwriter
 John Heisman, namesake of the Heisman Trophy, graduated from the law school in 1892
 Sarah Elizabeth Hughes, Class of 2018, (born May 2, 1985) a former American competitive figure skater who is the 2002 Winter Olympics Gold Medalist Champion and the 2001 World bronze medalist in ladies' singles
 Michael Smerconish, American television and radio host on CNN and SiriusXM graduated from Penn Law in 1987
 George Washington Woodruff (February 22, 1864 – March 24, 1934) Penn Law Class of 1895, Coach of Penn Crew (1892 through 1896) and Penn Football (1896 through 1901); as football coach (who originated “guards back,” “delayed pass,” and “flying interference” tactics) he compiled 124-15-2 record, including three undefeated seasons in 1894, 1895 and 1897 earning him election to the College Football Hall of Fame and his teams being recognized as national champions in 1894, 1895, and 1897; also served on number of government positions, chief law officer in the National Forest Service, Acting United States secretary of the interior under President Theodore Roosevelt, Pennsylvania Attorney General, federal judge for Territory of Hawaii

Notable faculty
The law school's faculty is selected to match its inter-disciplinary orientation. Seventy percent of the standing faculty hold advanced degrees beyond the JD, and more than a third hold secondary appointments in other departments at the university. The law school is well known for its corporate law group, with professors Jill Fisch, Elizabeth Pollman, and David Skeel being regularly included among the best corporate and securities law scholars in the country. The School has also built a strong reputation for its law and economics group (professors Tom Baker, Jon Klick, and Natasha Sarin), its criminal law group (professors Stephanos Bibas,  Kim Ferzan, Leo Katz, Stephen J. Morse, Shaun Ossei-Owusu, Paul H. Robinson, and David Rudovsky) and its legal history group (professors Sally Gordon, Sophia Lee, Serena Mayeri, Karen Tani). Some notable Penn Law faculty members include:

 Anita L. Allen, Henry R. Silverman Professor of Law and professor of philosophy  
 Tom Baker, deputy dean and insurance law 
 Stephanos Bibas, criminal law scholar, current judge for the US Court of Appeals for the Third Circuit
 Stephen B. Burbank, David Berger Professor for the Administration of Justice 
 Cary Coglianese, Edward B. Shils Professor of Law and professor of political science; director, Penn Program on Regulation  
 Jill Fisch, Saul A. Fox distinguished Professor of Business Law; co-director, Institute for Law and Economics 
 Douglas Frenkel, Morris Shuster Practice Professor of Law, director of Mediation Clinic 
 Sally Gordon, Arlin M. Adams Professor of Constitutional Law and professor of history 
 Allison Hoffman, professor of law
 Leo Katz, Frank Carano Professor of Law 
 Jonathan Klick, Charles A. Heimbold, Jr. Professor of Law
 Michael Knoll, Theodore K. Warner Professor of Law & Professor of Real Estate; Co-Director, Center for Tax Law and Policy
 Sophia Lee, professor of law and history 
 Serena Mayeri, professor of law and history 
 Charles ("Chuck") Mooney Jr., Charles A. Heimbold, Jr. Professor of Law   
Curtis R. Reitz, commercial law; Pennsylvania representative to the National Conference of Commissioners on Uniform State Laws
 Shaun Ossei-Owusu, Presidential Assistant Professor of Law  
 Elizabeth Pollman, professor of law and co-director of the Institute of Law and EconomicsWendell Pritchett, Provost; James S. Riepe Presidential Professor of Law and Education  
 Dorothy E. Roberts, George A. Weiss University Professor of Law and Sociology and Raymond Pace and Sadie Tanner Mossell Alexander Professor of Civil Rights
 Kermit Roosevelt, David Berger Professor for the Administration of Justice
 David Rudovsky, civil rights and criminal defense
 Chris William Sanchirico, Samuel A. Blank Professor of Law, Business, and Public Policy; Co-Director, Center for Tax Law and Policy 
 Anthony Joseph Scirica, current judge, and former chief judge, of the US Court of Appeals for the Third Circuit
 Stephanos Bibas, current judge of the US Court of Appeals for the Third Circuit
 Beth Simmons, Andrea Mitchell University Professor in Law, Political Science, and Business Ethics 
 Karen Tani, Seaman Family University Professor in Law and History 
 Amy Wax, Robert Mundheim Professor of Law 
 Tobias Barrington Wolff, Jefferson B. Fordham Professor of Law; Deputy Dean, Alumni Engagement and Inclusion 
 Christopher Yoo, John H. Chestnut Professor of Law, Communication, and Computer & Information Science; Director, Center for Technology, Innovation & Competition
 David Hoffman, William A. Schnader Professor of Law
 Kimberly Kessler Ferzan, Earle Hepburn Professor of Law and professor of philosophy; co-director, Institute of Law & Philosophy.

The School's faculty is complemented by renowned international visitors in the frames of the Bok Visiting International Professors Program. Past and present Bok professors include Helena Alviar (Dean of Faculty of Law, University of the Andes), Pratap Bhanu Mehta (President of the Centre for Policy Research in India), Armin von Bogdandy (Director at the Max Planck Institute for Comparative Public Law and International Law), Radhika Coomaraswamy (Under-Secretary-General of the United Nations, Special Rapporteur for Children and Armed Conflict 2006-2012, Member of the UN Fact Finding Mission on Myanmar), Juan Guzmán Tapia (the first judge who prosecuted former Chilean dictator Augusto Pinochet), Indira Jaising (Former Additional Solicitor General of India), Maina Kiai (UN Special Rapporteur on the rights to freedom of peaceful assembly and of association 2011-2017), Akua Kuenyehia (Former Judge of the International Criminal Court; Former Law Dean of University of Ghana), Pratap Bhanu Mehta (President of the Centre for Policy Research in India), and Michael Trebilcock (Distinguished University Professor at the University of Toronto).

Some of Penn's former faculty members have continued their careers at other institutions (e.g., Bruce Ackerman (now at Yale),  Lani Guinier (now at Harvard),  Michael H. Schill (now at Oregon), Myron T. Steele (now at Virginia), and Elizabeth Warren (at Harvard until her election to the United States Senate)).

References

External links

 
University of Pennsylvania Law School
1790 establishments in Pennsylvania
Law School
Ivy League law schools